Huang Zhen (8 January 1909 – 10 December 1989) was a politician of the People's Republic of China.

Biography
Huang was born in Tongcheng County, Anhui during the Qing dynasty (1644–1911). After graduating from Tongcheng Secondary School, he entered Shanghai Art College in 1925, majoring in painting. He did not complete his studies because he was expelled from the college after taking part in a student movement. Huang was admitted to Xinhua Art University. After graduation, he worked as a teacher at Fushan Middle School in his hometown. Huang was discharged for supporting a student movement in 1929. He enlisted in Feng Yuxiang's Northwest Army (Guominjun) in 1930.

In 1931, Huang took part in the Ningdu uprising and joined the Chinese Red Army. He joined the Chinese Communist Party in 1932. Huang took part in the Long March in 1934. During the Second Sino-Japanese War, Huang served as the vice chairman of 129th Division of the Eighth Route Army. Huang transferred to Henan as the secretary of Yubei, then he was transferred to Taihang Mountain as the chairman of Taihang Military Region. In 1948, Huang was transferred to Xibaipo as the vice chairman of the People's Liberation Army General Political Department.

Huang was appointed China's Ambassador to Hungary in 1950, he was transferred to China's Ambassador to Indonesia in 1954. In the same year, Huang attended the Asian-African Conference with Zhou Enlai. In 1961, Huang served as vice minister of Foreign Affairs of the People's Republic of China, then he served as the ambassador to deal with Sino-Indian border dispute. In 1964, Huang served as China's Ambassador to France.

In 1971, Huang went to America. In 1973, Huang was appointed chairman of Liaison Office of the People's Republic of China in United States.  In 1977, Huang served as deputy head of the Propaganda Department of the Chinese Communist Party and Minister of Culture of the People'e Republic of China.

In 1982, Huang retired. He served as a standing committee member of the Central Advisory Commission. Huang died in Beijing in 1989.

Personal life
Huang married , who is also a politician.

References

1909 births
Chinese Communist Party politicians from Anhui
Ministers of Culture of the People's Republic of China
1989 deaths
People's Republic of China politicians from Anhui
People from Tongling
Ambassadors of China to Hungary
Ambassadors of China to France
Ambassadors of China to Indonesia
Politicians from Anqing